Governor Hutchinson may refer to:

Asa Hutchinson (born 1950), Governor of Arkansas (2015-)
Thomas Hutchinson (governor) (1711–1780), Governor of the Province of Massachusetts Bay from 1769 to 1774
William Hutchinson (Rhode Island judge) (1586–1641), 2nd Judge (governor) of the Town of Portsmouth from 1639 to 1640

See also
Hutchinson (surname)